is a Japanese weightlifter. Shintani represented Japan at the 2008 Summer Olympics in Beijing, where he competed for the men's lightweight category (69 kg). Shintani placed tenth in this event, as he successfully lifted 135 kg in the single-motion snatch, and hoisted 175 kg in the two-part, shoulder-to-overhead clean and jerk, for a total of 310 kg.

References

External links
NBC 2008 Olympics profile

Japanese male weightlifters
1981 births
Living people
Olympic weightlifters of Japan
Weightlifters at the 2008 Summer Olympics
Sportspeople from Fukui Prefecture
Weightlifters at the 2006 Asian Games
Asian Games competitors for Japan
21st-century Japanese people